The 2008 NESTEA European Championship Final (or the 2008 European Beach Volleyball Championships) was held from July 10–13, 2008 in Hamburg, Germany. It was the sixteenth official edition of the European Beach Volleyball Championships men's event, which started in 1993, while the women competed for the fifteenth time.

The Championships were part of the 2008 Nestea European Championship Tour.

The teams could earn qualifying points for the Beijing 2008 Olympics, from one of their two finishes at the 2008 or 2007 Championships.

Women's competition
 A total number of 32 participating couples

The teams Gemise-Fareau-Giordano (FRA), Faure M.-Sarpaux V. (FRA), Nyström Em.-Nyström Er. (FIN), Baburina-Osheyko (UKR), Alseda Aizcorbe-Hopf Aguilar (ESP), Kolocova-Slukova (CZE), Gschweidl-Hansel B. (AUT) and Hanzelova-Tomasekova (SVK) were placed 25th, with 80 points each and no prize money.

Men's competition
 A total number of 32 participating couples

References

Goller and Ludwig are the 2008 European champions!, CEV, July 12, 2008

External links
Beach Volleyball Nestea European Championship Final at CEV

2008
E
B
B
Sports competitions in Hamburg
July 2008 sports events in Europe
2000s in Hamburg